Sphaerolobium acanthos, commonly known as Grampians globe-pea, is a species of flowering plant in the family Fabaceae and is endemic to a restricted part of the Grampians National Park in Victoria. It is an erect, wiry shrub with many spiny branchlets, scattered tapering leaves, and yellow, orange or reddish-brown flowers.

Description

Taxonomy and naming
Sphaerolobium acanthos was first formally described in 1994 by Michael Crisp in the journal Muelleria from specimens collected from the Grampians National Park in 1977. The specific epithet (acanthos) means "a prickly plant".

Distribution and habitat
Grampians globe-pea grows in forest, woodland and heath, usually near streams and is restricted to an small area in the Grampians National Park.

Conservation status
Sphaerolobium acanthos is classified as "critically endangered" under the Commonwealth Government Environment Protection and Biodiversity Conservation Act 1999 and as "vulnerable" under the Victorian Government Flora and Fauna Guarantee Act 1988. The main threats to the species include grazing by herbivores and disease caused by the fungus Phytophthora cinnamomi.

References

acanthos
Eudicots of Western Australia
Plants described in 1994
Taxa named by Michael Crisp